Cryptodontia is a group of dicynodont therapsids that includes the families Geikiidae, Oudenodontidae, and Rhachiocephalidae. It was first named in 1860 by English paleontologist Richard Owen. Owen intended Cryptodontia to be a family, and the name was later changed to "Cryptodontidae" to reflect this ranking. The name Cryptodontia was restored in 2009 when it was redefined as a larger clade containing several families of dicynodonts.

Classification
Below is a cladogram from Kammerer et al. (2011) showing the phylogenetic placement of Cryptodontia:

References

Dicynodonts
Guadalupian first appearances
Permian extinctions